Hebson is a surname. Notable people with the surname include:

Bryan Hebson (born 1976), American baseball player
Nadia Hebson (born 1974), English artist

See also
Henson (name)